Gustaf Albrecht Bror Cederström (21 September 1780 – 21 December 1877) was a Swedish baron and lieutenant general and Minister of War.

Biography
Cederström was born at Fornsigtuna, Sweden and was the only child of lieutenant general and later president of the Council of War (Krigskollegium), baron Bror Cederström (1754-1816) and his first wife Catharina Maria Voltemat. The father remarried in 1800 to the author Christina Mörner.

From 1816 to 1822, he headed the Cederströmian Hussar Regiment (Cederströmska husarregementet, previously named the Mörnerian Hussar Regiment, Mörnerska husarregementet, after the previous commander, Hampus Mörner, and later renamed the Crown Prince's Hussar Regiment, when Crown Prince Oscar became its commander) in Scania. During this time, he purchased the Säbyholm's lands outside Landskrona, where he actively worked to find new agricultural methods and established the first Swedish company for manufacturing beet sugar (though he had to sell these lands off and retire to Landskrona when he unexpectedly went bankrupt in 1848). In parallel with his business life he continued a military career, becoming supreme commander of Scania in 1819, then minister for war in 1840. He was awarded the Grand Cross of the Order of the Sword, the Order of the Seraphim and the Grand Cross of the Norwegian Order of St. Olav.

He married countess Christina Hilda Wachtmeister af Johannishus (died 1871) in 1815. They had two sons and two daughters.

Cederström was the stepson of Christina Charlotta Cederström.

References 

1780 births
1877 deaths
People from Upplands-Bro Municipality
Swedish Ministers for Defence
Swedish Army lieutenant generals
19th-century Swedish military personnel
Swedish military personnel of the Napoleonic Wars
Members of the Royal Swedish Academy of War Sciences
19th-century Swedish politicians
Commanders Grand Cross of the Order of the Sword
Commanders Grand Cross of the Order of the Polar Star
Bror